Kokošovce is a village and municipality in Prešov District in the Prešov Region of eastern Slovakia.

History
In historical records the village was first mentioned in 1272.

Geography

Population 
It has a population of about 926 people (2020-12-31).

Genealogical resources
The records for genealogical research are available at the state archive "Statny Archiv in Presov, Slovakia"
 Roman Catholic church records (births/marriages/deaths): 1814-1895 (parish A)
 Greek Catholic church records (births/marriages/deaths): 1762-1895 (parish B)
 Lutheran church records (births/marriages/deaths): 1768-1898 (parish B)

See also
 List of municipalities and towns in Slovakia

References

External links
 
 
 https://web.archive.org/web/20071006173841/http://www.statistics.sk/mosmis/eng/run.html
 Surnames of living people in Kokosovce

Villages and municipalities in Prešov District
Šariš